Hassard is a surname. Notable people with the surname include:

Bob Hassard (1929–2010), Canadian ice hockey player
Dean Hassard, Canadian politician
Frank Hassard, academic at the International Institute for Advanced Studies in Systems Research and Cybernetics, see Interactive democracy#Frank Hassard
John Rose Greene Hassard (1836–1888), American newspaper editor and historian
Michael Dobbyn Hassard (1817–1869), Irish politician
Robert Pelham Hassard (1888–1953), Canadian politician
Stacey Hassard, Canadian politician

See also
Hassard, Missouri, a community in the United States